Tsuyako "Sox" Kitashima (1918 – December 29, 2005) was a Japanese-American activist noted for her role in seeking reparations for Japanese American internment by the United States government during World War II, particularly as investigated by the Commission on Wartime Relocation and Internment of Civilians in the 1980s.

Kitashima was born Tsuyako May Kataoka in 1918 in Hayward, California, to Masajiro Kataoka and Yumi Ishimaru, who had emigrated from Yamaguchi Prefecture, Japan and owned a strawberry farm in Eden Township, Alameda County, California. She had five siblings. At school, her classmates were unable to pronounce her name, calling her "Socko" instead; this in time was further shortened to "Sox". Kitashima's family moved from Eden to Centerville, Fresno County, California, where she graduated from Washington Union High School in 1936.

Following the Japanese attack on Pearl Harbor on December 7, 1941, and signing of Executive Order 9066, Kitashima and her family were among those 120,000 Japanese Americans interned into relocation camps. They were kept in horse stalls at Tanforan, California, and later moved to a single room at Topaz War Relocation Center in Utah. The Kataokas were also moved to Tule Lake while interned. In August 1945, Tsuyako married Tamotsu Kitashima in Salt Lake City, Utah.

She later became a spokesperson for the National Coalition for Redress and Reparations, and fought for the Civil Liberties Act of 1988, by which the American government formally apologized and granted reparations to the wartime internees. In 1998, The Freedom Forum awarded her a Free Spirit Award, which came with US$10,000. She has also been recognized by the National Women's History Project as a National Women's History Month/Week honoree.

Kitashima died of a heart attack in a care home in San Francisco, California on December 29, 2005, aged 87.

References

External links
Tsuyako Kitashima at Discover Nikkei
Tsuyako Kitashima at What if No One's Watching?

1918 births
2005 deaths
Japanese-American internees
People from Hayward, California
Activists from the San Francisco Bay Area
Japanese-American civil rights activists